Bazhanov (masculine) or Bazhanova (feminine), sometimes transliterated as Bajanov, is a Russian surname. Notable people with the surname include:

Boris Bazhanov (1900–1983), Russian Soviet defector
Evgeny P. Bazhanov (born 1946), Russian political scientist and historian
Natalia E. Bazhanova (1947–2014), Russian political scientist
Svetlana Bazhanova (born 1972), Russian speed skater
Valentin A. Bazhanov (born 1953), Russian philosopher

See also
Bazanov
Bazhanov coal mine, coal mine in Ukraine

Russian-language surnames